William Raymond Williams (born 7 October 1960) is an English former footballer who played in the Football League for Manchester City, Rochdale and Stockport County.

References

External links
 Bill Williams stats at Neil Brown stat site

English footballers
English Football League players
Rochdale A.F.C. players
Manchester City F.C. players
Stockport County F.C. players
1960 births
Living people
Association football defenders